Glomar may refer to:

 Global Marine, a drilling contractor which merged with Santa Fe International Corporation to form GlobalSantaFe Corporation
 Glomar Challenger, the drillship used for the Deep Sea Drilling Project
 Glomar Explorer, a large salvage vessel built by the CIA
 Glomar response, a "neither confirm nor deny" response by agents of US national security